NGC 2477 (also known as Caldwell 71) is an open cluster in the constellation Puppis. It contains about 300 stars, and was discovered by Abbé Lacaille in 1751. The cluster's age has been estimated at about 700 million years.

Visual appearance 
NGC 2477 is a stunning cluster, almost as extensive in the sky as the full moon. It has been called "one of the top open clusters in the sky", like a highly resolved globular cluster without the dense center characteristic of globular clusters.  Burnham notes that several observers have remarked on its richness, and that although it is smaller than M46 (also an open cluster in Puppis), it is richer and more compact.

Distance

Notes

External links

 

2477
Open clusters
Puppis
071b
?